Churchill Livingstone is an academic publisher.

It was formed in 1971 from the merger of Longman's medical list, E & S Livingstone (Edinburgh, Scotland) and J & A Churchill (London, England) and was owned by Pearson. Harcourt acquired Churchill Livingstone in 1997. It is now integrated as an imprint in Elsevier's health science division after Elsevier acquired Harcourt in 2001.

In the past it published a number of classic medical texts, including Sir William Osler's textbook The Principles and Practice of Medicine, Gray's Anatomy, and Myles' Textbook for Midwives. In the 1980s, in addition to new texts in all areas of clinical medicine, it published an extensive list of medical  and nursing textbooks in low-cost editions for low-income countries supported by the UK-funded Educational Low Priced Book Scheme (ELBS).

References

External links
 

Elsevier imprints
Book publishing companies of the United Kingdom